Handschinia may refer to:
 Handschinia (bug), a genus of true bugs in the family Aphrophoridae
 Handschinia Stach, 1949, a genus of springtails in the family Neanuridae, synonym of Handschinurida
 Handschinia Massoud, 1967, a genus of springtails in the family Neanuridae, synonym of Arlesia